William Raymond Nesbit (June 1, 1899 – August 6, 1983) was an American jewel thief active in the 1930s. He was born in Marshalltown, Iowa.

Background
On December 31, 1936, he killed fellow thief Harold Baker in a gunpowder explosion in Minnehaha County, near Sioux Falls, South Dakota. He was arrested February 26, 1937, and was convicted and sentenced on May 28, 1937, to life imprisonment, which on February 18, 1946, was commuted to 20 years incarceration. Imprisoned in Sioux Falls, South Dakota, he eventually became a "trusty" and the personal chauffeur of the warden.

Disappearance and capture
On September 4, 1946, he failed to return from running errands, and on December 26, 1946, he was charged in absentia with unlawful flight to avoid confinement. On March 15, 1950, he became the third member of the Federal Bureau of Investigation's first-ever FBI ten most wanted fugitives list, and was arrested in a cave in Saint Paul, Minnesota, three days later.

Death 
Nesbit died at a hospital in Sioux City, Iowa on August 6, 1983. He had been suffering from a long illness prior to his death.

References

1899 births
1983 deaths
American escapees
American people convicted of murder
American prisoners sentenced to life imprisonment
Criminals from Iowa
FBI Ten Most Wanted Fugitives
Fugitives
Jewel thieves
People convicted of murder by South Dakota
People from Marshalltown, Iowa
People from Sioux Falls, South Dakota
Prisoners sentenced to life imprisonment by South Dakota